Col de la Madeleine (el. 1,993 m.) is a high mountain pass in the Alps in the department of Savoie in France which connects La Chambre in Maurienne with La Léchère in Tarentaise.  The pass is closed from November to the beginning of June. It has been described as "beautiful, but heartbreaking".

Cycling

Details of the climb

The southern approach from La Chambre (via the D213) is 19.05 km. long, gaining 1,522 m. at an average gradient of 8%. Alternatively, the route via the D76 is 19.8 km. long, climbing 1,520 m. at an average of 7.7%.

The northern approach can be accessed via Feissons-sur-Isère. From  Feissons-sur-Isère (through La Léchère), the climb is 25.3 km. long, gaining 1,585 m. at an average gradient of 6.2%. For the 2012 Tour de France, the height at the summit is shown as 2,000 m., whereas in previous years it has been shown as 1,993 m.

From Aigueblanche, the climb is 28.28 km. long, climbing 1,533 m. at an average of 5.4%.

On both sides of the Col de la Madeleine mountain pass cycling milestones are placed every kilometre. They indicate the distance to the summit, the current height, and the average slope in the following kilometre. Such signposting for cyclists has become common in most major mountain passes in the French Pyrenees and Alps.

Appearances in Tour de France
The pass was first included in the Tour de France in 1969 and has since featured 25 times.

It has been ranked hors catégorie, every year since 1995.

See also
 List of highest paved roads in Europe
 List of mountain passes
 Souvenir Henri Desgrange

References

External links 

Col de la Madeleine and preview of Stage 11 of the 2012 Tour de France
Col de la Madeleine cycling. Description, profiles and pictures
Col de la Madeleine on Google Maps (Tour de France classic climbs)

Climbs in cycle racing in France
Mountain passes of Auvergne-Rhône-Alpes
Mountain passes of the Alps